Franziska Christiane Johanna Friederike "Fanny" Tarnow (17 December 1779, Güstrow – 4 July 1862, Dessau) was a German author. She wrote under the names Fanny Tarnow and F.T.

Life 

Fanny Tarnow was the first child of the lawyer and secretary of state in Güstrow David Tarnow, later a Gutsbesitzer or landholder, and his wife, Amalie Justine Holstein. She grew up in wealthy circles, but was unable to walk after a fall when she was four. After her father lost his property, the family moved to Neu-Buckow and Fanny became a governess, first at Rügen for four years then at Rohlstorff. In 1805 she began publishing her journals anonymously and made contact with cultural figures including Johann Friedrich Rochlitz, Julius Eduard Hitzig, Friedrich de la Motte Fouqué, Rosa Maria Assing, Rahel and Karl August Varnhagen von Ense. From 1807 to 1812, she was a governess in Wismar and Rankendorf, then until 1815 she went to nurse her ill mother in Neu-Buckow.

From 1816 to 1818, she lived with a childhood friend in Saint Petersburg, where she met Friedrich Maximilian Klinger, August von Kotzebue and Count Jacob Johann Sievers. This was followed by temporary stays in Berlin and at her sister's house in Lübeck. Fanny and the writer Amalie Schoppe also headed a girls' reformatory in Hamburg. In 1820 Fanny moved to Schandau - during this time she befriended Helmina von Chezy, Elisa von der Recke, Ludwig Tieck, Christoph August Tiedge and countess Egloffstein. She then temporarily lost her sight due to illness and so in 1829 she moved to stay in Weißenfels with her sister Betty. 

Worried friends then selected some of her writings and published then on a subscription basis, raising 5,000 Taler for her. After that she mainly worked translating French and English works into German. From 1841 she lived in Dessau.

Works 
 (anonymous:) Alwine von Rosen, in: Journal für deutsche Frauen, 1805 und 1806
 Thekla
 Natalie. Ein Beitrag zur Geschichte des weiblichen Herzens, 1812
 Thorilde von Adlerstein, oder Frauenherz und Frauenglück. Eine Erzählung aus der großen Welt, 1816
 Mädchenherz und Mädchenglück. Erzählungen für Gebildete, 1817
 Kleine Erzählungen, 1817
 Briefe auf einer Reise nach Petersburg, an Freunde geschrieben, 1819
 Lilien. Erzählungen, 4 Bde.  1821/25
 Sidoniens Witwenjahre, nach dem Französischen frei bearbeitet, 2 Tle., 1822
 Lebensbilder, 2 Bde., 1824
 Die Spanier auf Fühnen. Historisches Schauspiel, 1827
 Ausgewählte Schriften, 15 Bde., 1830
 Zwei Jahre in Petersburg. Aus den Papieren eines alten Diplomaten, 1833
 Erzählungen und Novellen, fremde und eigene, 2 Tle., 1833
 Reseda, 1837
 Spiegelbilder, 1837
 Galerie weiblicher Nationalbilder, 2 Tle., 1838
 Gesammelte Erzählungen, 4 Bde., 1840–42
 Heinrich von England und seine Söhne. Eine alte Sage neu erzählt, 2 Tle., 1842

Bibliography 
  Monika Stranáková: "Es ist hier vieles ganz anders, als man bei uns glaubt…" Fanny Tarnows Reise nach St. Petersburg. In:  Christina Ujma: Wege in die Moderne. Reiseliteratur von Schriftstellerinnen und Schriftstellern des Vormärz. Bielefeld, 2009. . S. 229-242.
  Birgit Wägenbaur: Die Pathologie der Liebe. Literarische Weiblichkeitsentwürfe um 1800. Erich Schmidt, Berlin 1996 (Geschlechterdifferenz & Literatur. Band. 4). .
  Amely Bölte: Fanny Tarnow. Ein Lebensbild. 1865 (Digitalisat)

External links 

 Books on and by Fanny Tarnow in the Staatsbibliothek zu Berlin

1779 births
1862 deaths
19th-century German women writers
English–German translators
French–German translators
German diarists
Pseudonymous women writers
People from Güstrow
19th-century German writers
19th-century translators
Women diarists
19th-century diarists
19th-century pseudonymous writers